Hart Mountain National Antelope Refuge is a National Wildlife Refuge on Hart Mountain in southeastern Oregon, which protects more than  and more than 300 species of wildlife, including pronghorn, bighorn sheep, mule deer, sage grouse, and Great Basin redband trout. The refuge, created in 1936 as a range for remnant herds of pronghorn, spans habitats ranging from high desert to shallow playa lakes, and is among the largest wildlife habitats containing no domestic livestock.

Protected status
Since its creation as an antelope reserve, management of the refuge has broadened to include conservation of all wildlife species characteristic of this high desert habitat and restoration of native ecosystems for the public's enjoyment, education, and appreciation. The area's protected status has been remarked upon by former Supreme Court Justice William O. Douglas:

Recreational activities 

 Wildlife photography and observation are the most popular refuge activities.  There are permanent blinds throughout the refuge.
 Hiking is encouraged, but trails are not maintained, though most of the terrain permits cross-country hiking.
 Backpacking is the only way to experience remote parts of the refuge.
 Camping is free, but there are no reservations, and there is a 14-day limit.  Generators and power equipment are prohibited.
 Bicycling is limited to roads open to motor vehicles, but the rough roads require sturdy bikes.
 Fishing is allowed in a few locations, with an Oregon fishing license.
 Hunting is permitted for a very limited number of deer, pronghorn and bighorn sheep.
The nearby Bureau of Land Management Sunstone mine is a source for the Oregon state gemstone.

Logistics 
None of the refuge's roads are paved, and most are not passable by passenger autos. A few roads are graded, but most are dirt ruts ("jeep trails"). No services are available within the refuge, except compressed air, potable water, and a restroom at the refuge's headquarters.

Accommodations are available in Frenchglen.

Wildlife 

The diverse habitat supports diverse wildlife:  There are 239 bird species, 42 species of mammal, and at least eight species of reptile, including rattlesnake, bull snake, eastern yellowbelly racer, and various lizards.

Residents active year round include deer, bobcat, coyote, pronghorn, bighorn sheep, marmot, squirrel, and rabbit.
Most birds are seasonal. Golden eagle, sandhill crane, colorful sage grouse, and numerous migratory species.

Bighorn sheep prefer the rocky cliffs of the refuge's west side. Numerous shallow lakes, grassy spring fed meadows attract the greatest variety of species.

Bighorn sheep were eliminated by disease and hunting in this area by 1915.  Reintroduction began in 1954 from British Columbia stock.  There are now approximately 300 bighorn sheep.

Cattle Grazing 
Cattle grazing in the refuge caused damage including overgrazing, eroded stream banks, trampled springs, damaged aspen groves, and destroyed wildlife habitat. In 1994, cattle grazing was banned inside the refuge.  A study published in 2015 described the recovery of the landscape after cattle were removed, the return of vegetation including aspens, rushes, and willows, and the restoration of riparian areas.   A Public Broadcasting System documentary, "Rewilding a Mountain," was made about that recovery.

See also 
 List of National Wildlife Refuges in Oregon
 Klamath Basin National Wildlife Refuges Complex, a nearby refuge

References

External links 
 
 
 

National Wildlife Refuges in Oregon
Protected areas of Lake County, Oregon
Wetlands of Oregon
1936 establishments in Oregon
Landforms of Lake County, Oregon
Protected areas established in 1936